Črešnjevec ob Bistrici is a settlement in the Municipality of Bistrica ob Sotli in eastern Slovenia. The area is part of the traditional region of Styria. It is now included in the Lower Sava Statistical Region; until January 2014 it was part of the Savinja Statistical Region.

Name
The name of the settlement was changed from Črešnjevec to Črešnjevec ob Bistrici in 1953.

References

External links
Črešnjevec ob Bistrici on Geopedia

Populated places in the Municipality of Bistrica ob Sotli